Richard Francis-Jones (born 1960, Hertfordshire, England) is a highly awarded Australian architect. He is the design director of the Multidisciplinary design practice Francis-Jones Morehen Thorp (FJMT). He is a Life Fellow of the Australian Institute of Architects, an honorary fellow of the American Institute of Architects. and a
Member of the Royal Institute of British Architects.

Education 
Francis-Jones graduated from the University of Sydney with a Bachelor of Science (Architecture) in 1981 and a Bachelor of Architecture with First Class Honours and the University Medal in 1985. He attended Columbia University on an ITT Fellowship, where he studied under Kenneth Frampton, completing a Master of Science in Architecture and Building Design in 1987. He subsequently taught at Columbia University as an Adjunct Associate Professor of Architecture. Francis-Jones has taught at many Schools of architecture in Australia, is a former Visiting Professor at the University of New South Wales, and is currently teaching at the University of Technology Sydney.

Practice 
Following his studies at Columbia University, Francis-Jones practised at firms in New York, Los Angeles and Paris before returning to Sydney in 1989 where he joined FJMT’s predecessor, MGT Sydney. He became a director of the firm in 1996 and was a founding partner of Francis-Jones Morehen Thorp in 2003.

FJMT has a reputation as an ideas-driven practice "with an agenda for strong public engagement and masterful resolution of tectonics" and the firm’s work demonstrates "an extraordinary ability to uncover the real and often contradictory issues and potentials of a project by a very careful analysis of purpose and place".

Most of the firm’s major commissions have been won by competition and Francis-Jones is supportive of the power of the architectural competition to produce good architecture and create new opportunities for practices: "the more public the competition… the greater the contribution to the wider culture of architecture."

Francis-Jones’ approach is a response to the transition from industrial to digital economies and investigations utilising emerging sciences and technologies are evident. Yet, Francis-Jones considers, the potential of this knowledge to address society’s challenges and give architects new scope for imagination is limited by the tendency for architecture to be reduced to fetishised object for consumption. "An authentic contemporary architecture should not only attempt to somehow begin to reconcile humanity’s place in the world but also be directed towards rejuvenating, repoliticising our desiccated public realm. We should pursue an architecture appropriate to citizens rather than consumers."

‘…Francis-Jones has possibly been at his best in civic works... More than any other contemporary practice of comparable calibre in Australia, FJMT has been consistently engaged in the design and construction of large-scale public and/or commercial buildings ...Many of these works derive their plastic character from the unique, rather theatrical concept of lateral exfoliation, that is to say the folding out of brises soleil so as to visually engage the surrounding landscape, thereby emphasising a topographical affinity between the building and its context. In all of this work the issue of sustainability is given priority…’

Francis-Jones was the creative director of the Australian Institute of Architects’ 2008 National Conference, Critical Visions: Form Representation and the Culture of Globalisation, and is an editor of Skyplane and Content: a journal of architecture. Francis-Jones was President of the RAIA (NSW Chapter) from 2001–2002 and was a member of the NSW Architects Registration Board from 2001-2004.

Books 
 Architecture as Material Culture
 Truth and Lies in Architecture

Notable projects 
 UTS Central
 Inner Sydney High School
 EY Centre
 Te Ao Mārama - Auckland War Memorial Museum
 The Frank Bartlett Library and Moe Service Centre
 Auckland Art Gallery Toi o Tamaki
 Craigieburn
 Bankstown Library and Knowledge Centre
 Surry Hills Library & Community Centre
 Sydney Law School, University of Sydney
 The John Niland Scientia, University of New South Wales
 The Red Centre, University of New South Wales
 St. Barnabas, Broadway
 Darling Quarter, Sydney
 The Waterfront Pavilion – Australian National Maritime Museum 
 Bunjil Place

Awards 

 Australia Award for Urban Design 2012, PIA
 City of Sydney Lord Mayor’s Prize 2013, AIA (NSW)
 Greenway Award for Conservation 2005, AIA
 International Award 2012, RIBA
 International Public Library of the Year 2014, Danish Agency for Culture
 John Verge Award for Interior Architecture 2010, 2015 AIA (NSW)
 Jorn Utzon Award for International Architecture 2012, AIA
 Lachlan Macquarie Award for Heritage 2005, AIA
 Lloyd Rees Award for Excellence in Civic Design 2000, 2013, AIA (NSW)
 Milo Dunphy Award for Sustainable Architecture 2010, 2013, AIA (NSW)
 National Architecture Award for Public Architecture 2010, AIA
 National Architecture Award for Sustainable Architecture 2010, AIA
 NZ Architecture Medal 2012, NZIA
 Sir Arthur G Stephenson Award for Best Commercial Architecture 2013, AIA (NSW)
 Sir John Sulman Award for Outstanding Public Architecture
 Sir Zelman Cowen Award 2000, AIA
 WAF Office Category Winner 2011, 2014
 World Building of the Year Award 2013, WAF

Bibliography
 fjmt studio I Maestri dell'Architettura Collector's Edition - Hachette Publishing, 2019
 Architecture as Material Culture: The Work of Francis-Jones Morehen Thorp with Kenneth Frampton - Oro Editions, 2013
 In the Realm of Learning - The University of Sydney's New Law School by Richard Francis-Jones: Images Publishing, 2009
 The Mint Project by Robert (Editor) Griffin, Paul Berkemeier, Richard Francis-Jones, Gerard Reinmuth, Peter Watts, Philip Thalis, 2009

References

External links 
 FJMT website
 Richard Francis-Jones essays and bibliography
 Critical Visions - AIA National Conference 2008
 FJMT Australian Institute of Architects awards

Architects from Sydney
Living people
1960 births
British emigrants to Australia